Oakland is a historic mansion on a farm in Gallatin, Tennessee, U.S.. It was built circa 1850 by John Fontville, who also built the James B. Jameson House in Gallatin and Greenfield in Castalian Springs. The original owner, Daniel Wade Mentlo, was a physician who owned 23 slaves in 1850.

The house was designed in the Federal architectural style, with Greek Revival features. It has been listed on the National Register of Historic Places since October 2, 1992.

References

Houses on the National Register of Historic Places in Tennessee
Federal architecture in Tennessee
Greek Revival architecture in Tennessee
Houses completed in 1850
Buildings and structures in Sumner County, Tennessee